Ōzeki Station is the name of two train stations in Japan:

 Ōzeki Station (Fukui) (大関駅)
 Ōzeki Station (Fukuoka) (大堰駅)